The North–South express railway is a proposed high speed railway in Vietnam. The line would begin in Hanoi, crossing  Hà Tây, Hà Nam, Ninh Bình, Thanh Hóa, Nghệ An, Hà Tĩnh, Quảng Bình, Quảng Trị, Thừa Thiên-Huế, Đà Nẵng, Quảng Nam, Quảng Ngãi, Bình Định, Phú Yên, Khánh Hòa, Ninh Thuận, Bình Thuận, Đồng Nai, Bình Dương, and ending in Ho Chi Minh City. The rail line would connect the two most urbanised areas in Vietnam which are Hanoi in the North's Red River Delta in the north and Ho Chi Minh City in the South's Mekong River Delta. The cost of the line is estimated at US$55.85 billion, to be funded by official development assistance from Japan and by the Vietnamese government itself. The project is planned to be implemented in three phases: Hanoi to Vinh city (285 km); Vinh City to Nha Trang (896 km); and Nha Trang to Ho Chi Minh City (364 km). Construction activities on the first phase are expected to commence in 2020, and the whole project is scheduled for completion in 2050. This project is part of the country's railway transport development strategy by 2020 with a vision to 2050. The project is also part of the Trans-Asian railway network.

Overview

With preliminary topographical and geological surveillance already carried out by a joint Japanese-Vietnamese team, two sections of the railway—the  Hanoi–Vinh section and the  Ho Chi Minh City–Nha Trang section—were initially slated for implementation in stages between 2011 and 2015, with the implementation of the remaining Vinh–Nha Trang section starting in 2020. Japanese Shinkansen bullet train technology was proposed for use on this line; its technology—and its actual geographical track—would be completely independent of the existing North–South Railway line. Once completed, passengers travelling between Hanoi and Ho Chi Minh City would see transit times reduced from 32 hours to around 7 hours.

Once approval is granted, the project is expected to (i) reduce the demand for intercity transportation in Vietnam, traffic congestion and increase traffic safety; (ii) make the full use of geographical advantages and improve the connectivity among transport means to maximize the capacity of the transport system in Vietnam; (iii) play its rightful role as the backbone of transport sector, contributing to the reduction of logistics expenses and enhancement of national competitiveness. The project also can be seen as a nation-building project of Vietnam's government.

History 
The Japanese government, following the visit of Prime Minister Nguyễn Tấn Dũng to Japan in 2006, pledged to offer official development assistance for the project. The memorandum of understanding for the project (along with a related project, the North–South Expressway) was mutually signed by the two governments at that time.

In April 2010, Kawasaki Heavy Industries Ltd., Mitsubishi Heavy Industries Ltd., Mitsubishi Corp., Sumitomo Corp., and other Japanese companies had asked the Ministry of Transport to adopt their bullet train technology for the development of the project, which the Vietnam government agreed to. On June 19, 2010, after a month of deliberations, Vietnam's National Assembly rejected the current high-speed rail proposal, reportedly due to the US$56 billion cost involved. National Assembly deputy Nguyễn Minh Thuyết reportedly stated that the proposed cost was equal to about 50 per cent of the country's gross domestic product, and that ordinary Vietnamese citizens would not be able to afford the high fares. Senior economist Pham Chi Lan, who described the proposal as "economically unsound", noted that it would not serve the majority of Vietnamese citizens, 70 per cent of whom live in rural areas. National Assembly members are said to have asked for further study of the project. As late as August 2010, the Ministry of Transport confirmed that plans for the express railway were on hold pending further research. At that time, Nguyen Huu Bang, the chairman and CEO of national railway company Vietnam Railways, stated that the government was expected to resubmit the project after new leaders of the Communist Party are selected in 2011, and that the Japan International Cooperation Agency (JICA) would likely be asked to examine the feasibility of two priority sections from Hanoi to Vinh and from Ho Chi Minh City to Nha Trang. After a meeting with the Ministry of Transport in October 2010, Deputy Prime Minister Hoang Trung Hai was reported to have authorized the reception of Japanese technical assistance for those two sections.

In June 2010, the National Assembly of Vietnam (NAV) did not approve planning application of the project as the project is found to be costly following which the project was put on hold. Transport Engineering Design Inc has been appointed as the financial adviser. In September 2010, the proposal was again reviewed and a detailed study was started by the JICA. The project would be funded from the State budget and JICA conducted the study from May 2011 to March 2013.

In March 2013, JICA submitted a report to concerned authorities for the development of the project. In October 2013, JICA suggested the proposed route with an investment of US$10.2 billion. On the evaluation of JICA studies, the Vietnam Railways Corporation advised Ministry of Transport (Vietnam) and the government of Vietnam to approve JICA’s scheme and build the proposed rail line. The project is planned to be implemented through public-private partnership (PPP) mode. However, the model is yet to be finalized. Siemens is appointed as the technology consultant for the project.

In June 2014, the Ministry of Transport (Vietnam) submitted a proposal to the federal government. In 2015 the government approved the development strategy for Vietnam's railway transport to 2020 and vision to 2050, targeting the development of railway infrastructure and the high-level management of transport and services.

In September 2016, the Ministry of Transport (Vietnam) started updating three feasibility studies, which were submitted by the Japan Consultancy Joint Venture (JCJV), Korea International Cooperation Agency (KOICA) and the JICA in the year 2013. During October 2016, Hanoi General Export-Import JSC (Geleximco) and Hong Kong United Investors Holding (HUI) have expressed interest in co-developing the project and are waiting for the approval from the Ministry of Transport (Vietnam).

Shuji Eguchi, a director at the Japanese Transport Ministry's railway bureau, noted in an August 2010 interview that the proposed railway needed a "step-by-step approach", that Vietnam's conventional rail network was "single track and not electrified yet" and that the government needed to "train personnel and enact necessary legislation". On June 16, 2017, the National Assembly of Vietnam (NAV) officially approved the Revised Railway Laws which supplements many preferential and breakthrough mechanisms and policies.

In November 2017, Prime Minister Nguyễn Xuân Phúc announced that the Ministry of Transport's final plan for the express railway system will be completed and submitted to the National Assembly's consideration in 2019. The Assembly will then hold a final vote on whether to approve or reject funding for the project.

The consortium at a conference on November 12, 2018 chaired by the Ministry of Transport (MOT) said that the ratio of private investment is reasonable after they referred to investment models in Japan, France, China, and Taiwan. Speaking at the meeting, some experts said that the cost of US$38 million for a kilometer of express railway is too high in comparison with US$27 million in China and US$26 million in Spain. Deputy Minister of Transport Nguyen Ngoc Dong said that the rate in Vietnam is high due to site clearance and a lack of expertise and technologies. The MOT's representatives said that the express railway, which is designed to operate at the speed of 200-320 kilometers/hour, is able to compete with aviation but safer. 
But the experts cared for the internal rate of return (IRR) of the costly project. Reports at the event showed that the IRR would range from 8.9% to 10.6% if the fare is equal to 50% and 100% of air tickets of economy class, respectively. But no data of transport capacity and demand for the express railway has mentioned.

The Ministry of Transport is in the process of reviewing studies in order to complete the pre-feasibility study for the project and planning to submit the pre-feasibility study report to the Government in 2019 so that it could be passed to the National Assembly of Vietnam (NAV) for approval. Construction activities on the first phase is expected to commence in 2020 and the whole project is scheduled for completion in 2050.

Context

Vietnam is a country with a relatively complete and early railway system in the Southeast Asia region. Experiencing ups and downs over a hundred years of history, with the breakthrough of other modes of transport, the railway network is still stuck in place, not only no further extension but also being dismantled.

Currently, there is a lack of transport infrastructure along the north–south corridor - traveling the 1700 km from Hanoi to Ho Chi Minh City takes 30 hours by conventional rail and by intercity bus, and around 2 hours by air. With the ever-increasing demands placed on existing transportation networks, traffic congestion occurs throughout the system, decreasing the system's safety and having negative impacts on regional economic development, national productivity, and environmental quality.

Sino-Japanese competition for infrastructure projects

Many studies have suggested that there is a pressing need to develop infrastructure across Asia, especially across Southeast Asia. However, Southeast Asian countries do not have the budget enough for infrastructure development. According to a report by the Asia Development Bank (ADB), Southeast Asia needs US$1.7 trillion annually from 2016 to 2030 on infrastructure to maintain its growth momentum. Therefore, these countries are looking for supports from Asian big powers. In this context, Japan and China have increasingly emerged as regional technical and economic competitors, as evidenced by their rivalry for infrastructure projects through funding entities and large-scale technological systems (especially mass rapid transit and high-speed railway) in Southeast Asia.

Japan has had a decades-long head start in the high-speed rail business rolling out the first concern passenger service in 1964. It has not stopped innovating as demonstrated by a test run of a magnetically levitated train exceeding 600 km/h. The Chinese who entered the business in 2007 now boasts of more than half of the world's 23,000 km of the high-speed rail track. They are reported to be in talks with 15 countries to sell their rail technology. 
In an interview with  Voice of America (VOA), Richard Lawless, chairman of the Nation Texas Central Railroad Project which enjoys Japanese backing sees Japan is offering the better trains. He thought that "On the technology, operational experience, safety side certainly as the Japanese, they have really an unprecedented record of operational performance and safety. They are the golden bar now." But Lawless and others acknowledge China is more aggressive than Japan on financing aging rollout of The Asian Infrastructure Investment Bank (AIIB) is certain to give it up a further advantage. And China is seen as virtual compelled to export its high-speed rail technology." The Chinese is exhausting itself with the build-out of their currently undertaking they have to go overseas.

In Thailand, Japan’s firms are going to construct the Bangkok-Chiang Mai HSR project in 2019, a meter-gauge double-track line linking Bangkok and Kanchanaburi province to Laem Chabang, and possibly the two east-west corridors (1st corridor - “lower east-west corridor” - 574 km from the Thai province of Kanchanaburi on the border with Myanmar to the eastern province of Aranyaprathet on the Cambodia border; 2nd corridor - “the upper east-west corridor” - from Mae Sot in Tak Province, bordering Myanmar, to Mukdahan province, bordering Laos). Meanwhile, China's firms are constructing the construction of 874 km of Thailand - China railway project.

In Indonesia, China won against Japan the bid on the Jakarta-Bandung HSR project in the Jakarta-Surabaya HSR, while Japan is working with the Indonesian government in constructing the mass rapid transit (MRT) in Jakarta.

In Malaysia, Chinese firms have a dominant market share in the rail sector in Malaysia, supplying some 80 percent of the rolling stock in the use. China firms won RM55 billion contract to build the East Coast Rail Line. Japan and China are the front-runners in the 350km HSR between Kuala Lumpur and Singapore.

In Vietnam, the line in Ho Chi Minh City is largely backed by funding and expertise from the JICA, as well as Sumitomo Corp. and Shimizu-Maeda, two huge Japanese conglomerates. The inaugural Hanoi line, on the other hand, relies on major support from a consortium of Chinese companies headed by the China Railways Sixth Group.

Le Hong Hiep, a research fellow at the ISEAS – Yusof Ishak Institute (Singapore) emphasized that while working with Vietnamese partners to make the project more sellable to the Vietnamese public and lawmakers, Japanese companies may also need to keep an eye on their Chinese competitors who benefit from China's large funds available for overseas high-speed rail projects under the Belt and Road Initiative (BRI). Although Chinese contractors and China-funded projects have a poor track record in Vietnam and are perceived negatively by the Vietnamese public, if China can provide the desired technology and offer favorable financing conditions for the project, this may tip the balance in their favor, especially given that China's high-speed train technologies have witnessed major advances in recent years.

Other high-speed railway projects in Vietnam 

Tuoi Tre News and Saigon Times reported that Ho Chi Minh City–Cần Thơ express railway will be funded by Canadian private company. Canada's MorFund Financial Inc. will contribute 6.3 billion Canadian dollars (US$5 billion) in a high-speed railway connecting Ho Chi Minh City with the Mekong Delta region, with its last stop in Can Tho.

See also 

 Transport in Vietnam
 Rail transport in Vietnam
 North–South railway (Vietnam)
 North–South expressway (Vietnam)

References

 High-speed train planned for Vietnam. International Herald-Tribune. February 6, 2007.
 Vietnam to build high speed train. Reuters. February 6, 2007.

Sources 
 Del Testa, David Willson (2001), Paint the Trains Red: Labor, Nationalism, and the Railroads in French Colonial Indochina, 1898—1945, Ph.D. Dissertation, University of California, Davis.
 Deutsch, Karl Wolfgang & Folt, William J., eds (1966), Nation Building in Comparative Contexts, New York, Atherton.
 Doling, Tim (2012), The Railways and Tramways of Việt Nam, Bangkok: White Lotus Press.
 Le, T. V., Zhang, J., Chikaraishi, M., & Fujiwara, A. (2018), Influence of introducing high-speed railways on intercity travel behavior in Vietnam, arXiv preprint arXiv:1810.00155
 Mylonas, Harris (2017),“Nation-building,” Oxford Bibliographies in International Relations. Ed. Patrick James. New York: Oxford University Press.

External links 
 YouTube link: High Speed, High Safety: Shinkansen Documentary
 YouTube link: The Japanese Bullet Train Engineering Connections - BBC Documentary
 YouTube link: Fears of financial overreach rise over Vietnam’s first high speed railway VnExpress International
 North–South express railway Vietnam A resource page with an archive of news articles, maps of the route, and links to feasibility studies.

Railway lines in Vietnam